Rosalina Neri (born 12 November 1927) is an Italian stage, television, film and radio actress.

Life and career 
Born in Arcisate, Province of Varese, Neri started her career appearing in the 1954 Garinei & Giovannini's musical comedy Tobia la candina spia. She had her breakout with the Marcello Marchesi's RAI variety show Invito al sorriso, and got a lot of press coverage because of her resemblance to Marilyn Monroe, which led to her being labeled as the "Italian Marilyn Monroe" and nicknamed Marilina. 

During a trip in England to shoot a television commercial Neri knew the conductor Jack Hylton, with whom she started a long relationship and had a daughter, Angela. During her career she was mainly active on stage, where among others she worked with Giorgio Strehler and Umberto Simonetta.

Selected filmography 
 I pinguini ci guardano (1956)
  (1958)
  (1968)
 The Betrothed (TV, 1989)
 The House of Smiles (1991)
 Three Men and a Leg (1997)
 All the Moron's Men (1999)
 Finalmente soli (TV, 1999-2004)
  (2012)
 The Predators (2020)

References

External links 
 

1927 births
Living people
People from the Province of Varese
Italian stage actresses
Italian film actresses
Italian television actresses
Italian radio actresses